The 1992 Pre-Olympic Basketball Tournament for Women was the FIBA World Olympic Qualifying Tournament for basketball at the 1992 Summer Olympics in Barcelona, Spain. It was held in Vigo, from May 28 till June 8. 16 teams were divided into eight groups. The best four from final round qualified directly for the Olympic Games.

Group A 

|}

All games played at Vigo.

Group B

|}

All games played at Vigo.

References 

1992
Qualifying
Basketball
International basketball competitions hosted by Spain
1991–92 in European basketball
1991–92 in Spanish basketball
Basketball at the 1992 Summer Olympics – Women's tournament